The women's 400 metres at the 2012 IAAF World Indoor Championships will be held at the Ataköy Athletics Arena on 9 and 10 March.

Medalists

Records

Qualification standards

Schedule

Results

Heats
Qualification: First 2 in each heat (Q) and the next 6 fastest (q) advance to the semifinals.

Semifinals

Qualification: First 2 of each heat qualified (Q).

 † = Bimbo Miel Ayedou's sample later tested positive for banned substances and she was disqualified.

Final

References

400 metres
400 metres at the World Athletics Indoor Championships
2012 in women's athletics